Kerstin Ringberg (March 27, 1925 – July 24, 2001) was a Swedish model who became the first winner of the Miss Sweden pageant in 1949.

References

1925 births
2001 deaths